Dan Armon, Israeli poet, was born in Jerusalem in 1948, the year Israel gained independence. He studied literature and theater at the Hebrew University of Jerusalem and has published four books of poems.

References
The Modern Hebrew Poem Itself, 2003,

External links
About Dan Armon 
 http://www.eurozine.com/authors/armon.html

1948 births
Living people
Israeli poets
Hebrew University of Jerusalem alumni
Writers from Jerusalem
Date of birth missing (living people)